The West African Football Union, officially abbreviated as WAFU-UFOA and WAFU,  is an association of the football playing nations in West Africa. It was the brainchild of the Senegal Football Federation who requested that the nations belonging to CAF's Zone A and B meet and hold a regular competitive tournament. The union organises several competitions including the WAFU Nations Cup and in 2008 they organised an under-20 championship.

Presidents 
The union's current president is actually Amos Adamu, but he was banned for three years from football activity by FIFA over vote-buying claims for the bids of the 2018 and 2022 FIFA World Cups. Kwesi Nyantakyi was appointed interim president in Adamu's absence. Adamu has since appealed the ban at the Court of Arbitration for Sport.
  K. Tandoh (1975–1977)
  Seyi Memene (1977–1984)
  Abdoulaye Fofana (1984–1988)
  Jonathan Boytie Ogufere (1988–1994)
  Dieng Ousseynou (1994–1999)
  Abdulmumini Aminu (1999–2002)
  El Hadji Malick Sy (2002–2004)
  Jacques Anouma (2004–2008)
  Amos Adamu (2008–2010)
  Kwesi Nyantakyi (2011–2018)

Member associations 
The union was founded in 1975 with all the current members, but in 2011 the Confederation of African Football decided to split it into two zones, citing "the organisational issues that face WAFU."
Zone A (Niger)
Zone B (Volta Niger)

Mauritania is the only WAFU member to also be a member of the Union of Arab Football Associations.

Competitions

WAFU runs several competitions which cover men's, women's, youth.

Current title holders

Defunct competitions

FIFA world rankings

Men's national teams
Rankings are calculated by FIFA.

Last updated 25 August 2022

Top Ranked Men's National Football Teams

See also

Confederation of African Football (CAF)
Central African Football Federations' Union (UNIFFAC)
Council for East and Central Africa Football Associations (CECAFA)
Council of Southern Africa Football Associations (COSAFA)
Union of North African Football Federations (UNAF)

References

External links 
 West African Football Union A – official website UFOA A
 West African Football Union B – official website UFOA B